Godadra was a city and a Municipality  in Surat City in the Indian state of Gujarat. The town comes under Greater Surat. Godadara is one of the eight amalgamated municipalities in Surat and was added to Limbayat Zone.

Geography 
The city is located at  an average elevation of 15 metres (66 feet).

Demographics
 India census, Godadra had a population of 21870 . Males constitute 52% of the population and females 48%. Sachin has an average literacy rate of 74%, higher than the national average of 59.5%: male literacy is 81%, and female literacy is 63%. In Sachin, 14% of the population is under 6 years of age.

Transport 
By road: Godadra is 14 km from Udhana and 8 km from Surat. There is Deepak Gas agency.  Gyan Sagar Hindi school, Manny schools.

By air: Nearest airport is Surat which is 30 km from Godadra.

See also 
List of tourist attractions in Surat

References 

Suburban area of Surat
Cities and towns in Surat district

bpy:সচিন